"One Day" is the third single from New Zealand band Opshop's second studio album, Second Hand Planet.

The song won the 2008 APRA Silver Scroll for Song of the Year.

The video features New Zealand singer Dianne Swann, previously in the bands Everything That Flies, When The Cat's Away and currently performing with Brett Adams as The Bads.

Charts

References

2007 singles
2007 songs
APRA Award winners
Opshop songs
Rock ballads